Antonio Cerroni (12 August 1924 – 24 March 2020) was an Italian wrestler. He competed in the men's Greco-Roman light heavyweight at the 1960 Summer Olympics.

References

External links
 

1924 births
2020 deaths
Italian male sport wrestlers
Olympic wrestlers of Italy
Wrestlers at the 1960 Summer Olympics
Sportspeople from Rome